Carmarthenshire NHS Trust was an NHS Trust in Wales. The headquarters of the trust was in Glangwili General Hospital, Carmarthen. The Hywel Dda Health Board HQ is in Haverfordwest.

The trust served around 170,000 people across Carmarthenshire and neighbouring counties.  It had two main hospitals, Prince Philip Hospital, Llanelli, and Glangwili General Hospital in Carmarthen, with accident & emergency services.  There were four smaller, community hospitals.

Carmarthenshire NHS Trust had over 3,200 staff. The chairman was Mrs Margaret Price, and the chief executive was Paul Barnett.

It merged with Ceredigion & Mid Wales NHS Trust and Pembrokeshire & Derwen NHS Trust in April 2008. The name for the newly merged trust is Hywel Dda NHS Trust.

Major hospitals
Major hospitals were as follows:
Amman Valley Hospital
Bryntirion Hospital, closed in 2004.
Llandovery Hospital
Mynydd Mawr Hospital, closed in 2013.
Prince Philip Hospital
Glangwili General Hospital

References

External links
Carmarthenshire NHS Trust
Guide to Carmarthenshire NHS Trust services – PDF file

Defunct Welsh NHS Trusts
Organisations based in Carmarthenshire